James Edward Malone (born February 20, 1962) is a Canadian retired professional ice hockey centre.

Career
Malone was an outstanding junior hockey player with the Toronto Marlboros of the (OMJHL/OHL), racking up 48 points with the Marlboros in his rookie season 1979–80. He was picked in the 1st round, 14th overall, in the 1980 NHL Entry Draft by the New York Rangers. He continued to play with the Marlboros until 1982. Malone then moved on and played with the Tulsa Oilers of the Central Hockey League (CHL) in 1982–83, where he had 15 points in 29 games. In December 1982 Malone suffered a knee injury. Malone came back from the injury to play with the Moncton Alpines of the American Hockey League (AHL) for the rest of the 1982–83 season. He returned to the Tulsa Oilers for the 1983–84 season and went on to win the league's playoff title that year. Malone later played with the Salt Lake Golden Eagles of the International Hockey League (IHL) and the Fredericton Express of the AHL for the 1984–85 season. It was after the 84–85 season that Malone's knee injury forced him to end his career.

Championships
He won the 1983-84 CHL Championship (Adams Cup) as a member of the Tulsa Oilers team coached by Tom Webster.

Family
Jim Malone is the younger brother of former NHL player and current Tampa Bay Lightning scout Greg Malone, as well as the uncle to former NHL player Ryan Malone (Greg's son). His own son Brad Malone was a 4th round pick of the Colorado Avalanche in 2007, and currently plays for the AHL Bakersfield Condors, in the Edmonton Oilers organization.

Career statistics

References

External links

1962 births
Canadian ice hockey centres
Fredericton Express players
Ice hockey people from New Brunswick
Living people
Moncton Alpines (AHL) players
New York Rangers draft picks
People from Miramichi, New Brunswick
Salt Lake Golden Eagles (IHL) players
Toronto Marlboros players
Tulsa Oilers (1964–1984) players
National Hockey League first-round draft picks
Canadian expatriate ice hockey players in the United States